Hermaeidae is a taxonomic family of sacoglossan sea slugs. These are marine opisthobranch gastropod mollusks in the superfamily Plakobranchoidea.

This family has no subfamilies.

Genera
Jensen (1996) listed three genera Aplysiopsis, Hermaea and Hermaeopsis A. Costa, 1869, which has been synonymized with * Hermaea.

Jensen (2007) listed two valid genera in the family Hermaeidae:

 Aplysiopsis Deshayes, 1839–53
 Caliphylla A. Costa, 1867
 Cyerce Bergh, 1870
 Hermaea Lovèn, 1844 - type *
 Mourgona Er. Marcus & Ev. Marcus, 1970
 Polybranchia Pease, 1860
 Sohgenia Hamatani, 1991
Genera brought into synonymy
 Beccaria Trinchese, 1870: synonym of Caliphylla A. Costa, 1867
 Branchophyllum Pruvot-Fol, 1947: synonym of Polybranchia Pease, 1860 (invalid: junior objective synonym of Phyllobranchillus, an earlier replacement name by the same author for the same homonym.)
 Hermaeina Trinchese, 1874: synonym of Aplysiopsis Deshayes, 1853
 Hermaeopsis A. Costa, 1869: synonym of Hermaea Lovén, 1844
 Jenseneria Ortea & Moro, 2015: synonym of Mourgona Er. Marcus & Ev. Marcus, 1970
 Lobiancoia Trinchese, 1881: synonym of Cyerce Bergh, 1870
 Lobifera Pease, 1866: synonym of Polybranchia Pease, 1860 (Unnecessary substitute name for Polybranchia Pease, 1860)
 Phyllobranchillus Pruvot-Fol, 1933: synonym of Polybranchia Pease, 1860
 Phyllobranchopsis Eliot, 1905: synonym of Aplysiopsis Bergh, 1898: synonym of Aplysia Linnaeus, 1767
 Phyllobranchus Alder & Hancock, 1864: synonym of Polybranchia Pease, 1860 (Invalid: junior homonym of Phyllobranchus Girard, 1851 [Annelida]; Phyllobranchillus and Branchophyllum are replacement names)
 Physopneumon A. Costa, 1864: synonym of Hermaea Lovén, 1844
 Polybranchea: synonym of Polybranchia Pease, 1860
 Polybranchus: synonym of Polybranchia Pease, 1860

Other invalid species within family Hermaeidae include:
 Physopneumon carneum A. Costa, 1862

References

 Moro L. & Ortea J. (2015). Nuevos taxones de babosas marinas de las islas Canarias y de Cabo Verde (Mollusca: Heterobranchia). Vieraea. 43: 21-86.
 Bouchet P., Rocroi J.P., Hausdorf B., Kaim A., Kano Y., Nützel A., Parkhaev P., Schrödl M. & Strong E.E. (2017). Revised classification, nomenclator and typification of gastropod and monoplacophoran families. Malacologia. 61(1-2): 1-526

External links 
  Adams H. & Adams A. (1853-1858). The genera of Recent Mollusca; arranged according to their organization. London, van Voorst. Vol. 1: xl + 484 pp.; vol. 2: 661 pp.; vol. 3: 138 pls

 
Gastropod families